Wittmerius is a genus of beetles belonging to the family Curculionidae.

Its native range is Southern South America.

Species
Species:
 Wittmerius longirostris Kuschel, 1952

References

Curculionidae
Curculionidae genera